Koreans, also known as the Korean people are an East Asian ethnic group native to the Korean Peninsula.

Koreans mainly live in the two Korean nation states: North Korea and South Korea (collectively and simply referred to as just Korea). They are also an officially recognized ethnic minority in other Asian countries; such as China, Japan, Kazakhstan and Uzbekistan. Koreans also form sizeable communities in Europe, specifically in Russia, Germany, United Kingdom, and France. Over the course of the 20th century, Korean communities have also formed in the Americas (especially in the United States and Canada) and Oceania.

As of 2021, there were an estimated 7.3 million ethnic Koreans residing outside Korea.

Etymology

South Koreans refer to themselves as Hanguk-in or Hanguk-saram, both of which mean "people of (Sam)han." When including members of the Korean diaspora, Koreans often use the term Han-in. Korean Americans refer to themselves as Hangukgye-Migukin.

North Koreans refer to themselves as Joseon-in or Joseon-saram, both of which literally mean "people of Joseon". The term is derived from the Joseon dynasty, a Korean kingdom founded by Yi Seonggye that lasted for approximately five centuries from 1392 to 1910. Using similar words, Koreans in China refer to themselves as Chaoxianzu in Chinese or Joseonjok, Joseonsaram in Korean, which are cognates that literally mean "Joseon ethnic group". Ethnic Koreans living in Russia and Central Asia refer to themselves as Koryo-saram, alluding to Goryeo, a Korean dynasty spanning from 918 to 1392.

In the chorus of the South Korean national anthem, Koreans are referred to as Daehan-saram.

In an interkorean context, such as when dealing with the Koreanic languages or the Korean ethnicity as a whole, additionally the term  is used.

Origins

Linguistic and archaeological studies
Modern Koreans are suggested to be the descendants of a prehistoric group of people from Southern Siberia/Manchuria, who moved to the northern Korean Peninsula as well as Koreanized indigenous populations in the southern part of the peninsula. Archaeological evidence suggests that Proto-Koreans were migrants from Manchuria during the Bronze Age. According to most linguists and archaeologists with expertise in ancient Korea, the linguistic homeland of Proto-Korean and of early Koreans is located somewhere in Southern Siberia/Manchuria, such the Liao river area or the Amur region. Later, Koreanic-speakers migrated to northern Korea and started to expand further south, replacing and assimilating Japonic-speakers and likely causing the Yayoi migration. Whitman (2012) suggests that the Proto-Koreans arrived in the southern part of the Korean Peninsula at around 300 BCE and coexisted with the descendants of the Japonic Mumun cultivators (or assimilated them). Vovin suggests Proto-Korean is equivalent to the variant of Koreanic languages spoken in southern Siberia/Manchuria and northern Korean peninsula by the time of the Three Kingdoms of Korea period and spread to southern Korea through influence from Goguryeo migrants.

However, a number of Korean scholars such as Jangsuk Kim and Jinho Park reject the view that the Korean speakers were not native to the Korean Peninsula, and argue that no solid evidence of such linguistic migration/shift as well as population and material change in the peninsular region has ever been found to support such view.

The largest concentration of dolmens in the world is found on the Korean Peninsula. In fact, with an estimated 35,000-100,000 dolmen, Korea accounts for nearly 40% of the world's total. Similar dolmens can be found in Manchuria, the Shandong Peninsula and the Kyushu island, yet it is unclear why this culture only flourished so extensively on the Korean Peninsula and its surroundings compared to the bigger remainder of Northeast Asia.

Anthropometry
Stephen Pheasant (1986), who taught anatomy, biomechanics and ergonomics at the Royal Free Hospital and the University College, London, said that Far Eastern people have proportionately shorter lower limbs than Europeans and Sub-Saharan Black Africans. Pheasant said that the proportionately short lower limbs of Far Eastern people is a difference that is most characterized in Japanese people, less characterized in other modern East Asian populations such as the Koreans and Chinese, and the least characterized amongst Southeast Asian populations such as the Vietnamese and Thais.

The British-Canadian psychologist Neville Moray in 2005 said that, for Korean and Japanese pilots, sitting height is more than 54% of their stature, with about 46% of their stature from leg length. Moray said that, for Americans and most Europeans, sitting height is about 52% of their stature, with about 48% of their stature from leg length.

Craniometry
In a craniometric study, Pietrusewsky (1994) found that the Japanese series, which was a series that spanned from the Yayoi period to modern times, formed a single branch with Korea. Later, Pietrusewsky (1999) found, however, that Korean and Yayoi people were very highly separated in the East Asian cluster, indicating that the connection that Japanese have with Korea would not have derived from Yayoi people.

Park Dae-kyoon et al. (2001) said that distance analysis based on thirty-nine non-metric cranial traits showed that Koreans are closer craniometrically to Kazakhs and Mongols than Koreans are close craniometrically to the populations in China and Japan.

Genetics

Koreans display high frequencies of the Y-DNA haplogroups O2-M122 (approximately 40% of all present-day Korean males), O1b2-M176 (approximately 30%), and C2-M217 (approximately 15%). Some regional variance may exist; in a study of South Korean Y-DNA published in 2011, the ratio of O2-M122 to O1b2-M176 is greatest in Seoul-Gyeonggi (1.8065), with the ratio declining in a counterclockwise direction around South Korea (Chungcheong 1.6364, Jeolla 1.3929, Jeju 1.3571, Gyeongsang 1.2400, Gangwon 0.9600). Haplogroup C2-M217 tends to be found in about 13% of males from most regions of South Korea, but it is somewhat more common (about 17%) among males from the Gyeongsang region in the southeast of the peninsula and somewhat less common (about 7%) among males from Jeju, located off the southwest coast of the peninsula. Haplogroup C2-M217 has been found in a greater proportion (about 26%) of a small sample (n=19) of males from North Korea. However, haplogroups are not a reliable indicator of an individual's overall ancestry; Koreans are more similar to one another in regard to their autosomes than they are similar to members of other ethnic groups.

Koreans, along with Mongolian and Tungusic speakers are generally considered a Northeast Asian group. The mitochondrial DNA markers (mtDNA haplogroups and HVR-I sequences) of Korean populations showed close relationships with Manchurians, Japanese, Mongolians and northern Han Chinese but not with Southeast Asians. Y-chromosomal distances showed a close relationship to most East Asian groups, including Southeast Asian ones. Ancient genome comparisons revealed that the genetic makeup of Koreans can be best described as an admixture of the Neolithic Devil's Gate genome in the Amur region in the Russian Far-East adjacent to North Korea as well as that of rice-farming agriculturalists from the Yangtze river valley, which in turn are often linked to O2-M122. The results from the findings in the Devil's Gate showed that the ancient populations of the area were already admixed from both Northeast Asian and Southeast Asian groups.  These groups correlate closely to modern Koreanic and Japonic, who form a cluster in regional comparisons, along with various Tungusic groups. East Asians, including Northeast Asian groups (Mongolic, Turkic, Uralic, Koreanic, Tungusic, Paleosiberian, and Southeast Asian ones (Mainland Southeast Asians, Insular Southeast Asians) are closer related to another than other population groups and can trace themselves to a common ancestry from several tens of thousands of years ago.

Studies of polymorphisms in the human Y-chromosome have so far produced evidence to suggest that the Korean people have a long history as a distinct, mostly endogamous ethnic group, with successive prehistoric waves of people moving to the peninsula and two major Y-chromosome haplogroups. Koreans show a close genetic relationship with other modern East Asians such as the Yamato Japanese, Southern Tungusic groups and some northern Han Chinese subgroups from Hebei and Manchuria. and with Neolithic specimens recovered from Chertovy Vorota Cave in Primorsky Krai, who themselves are the closest genetic relatives to the Udege and the Hezhen. The reference population for Koreans used in Geno 2.0 Next Generation is 94% Eastern Asia and 5% Southeast Asia & Oceania.

According to a genetic distance measurements from a large scale genetic study from 2021 titled 'Genomic insights into the formation of human populations in East Asia', Koreans are genetically closest to Japanese, followed by a larger margin by Northern Han on FST genetic distance measurements.

Genealogy
Korea Foundation Associate Professor of History, Eugene Y. Park said that many Koreans seem to have a genealogical memory blackout before the twentieth century. According to him the vast majority Koreans do not know their actual genealogical history. Through "inventing tradition" in the seventeenth and eighteenth centuries, families devised a kind of master narrative story that purports to explain a surname-ancestral seat combination's history to the extent where it is next to impossible to look beyond these master narrative stories. He gave an example of what "inventing tradition" was like from his own family's genealogy where a document from 1873 recorded three children in a particular family and a later 1920 document recorded an extra son in that same family. Park said that these master narratives connect the same surname and ancestral seat to a single, common ancestor. This trend became universal in the nineteenth century, but genealogies which were published in the seventeenth century actually admit that they did not know how the different lines of the same surname or ancestral seat are related at all. Only a small percentage of Koreans had surnames and ancestral seats to begin with, and that the rest of the Korean population had adopted these surname and ancestral seat identities within the last two to three hundred years.

Culture

North Korea and South Korea share a common heritage, but the political division since 1945 has resulted in some divergence of their modern cultures.

Language

The language of the Korean people is the Korean language, which uses Hangul as its main writing system. Daily usage of Hanja has been phased out in Korean peninsula other than usage by selected South Korean media companies (mostly conservative) when referring to key politicians (e.g. current and former Presidents, leaders of major political parties) or handful of countries (e.g. China, Japan, US, UK) as an abbreviation. Otherwise, Hanja is exclusively used for academic, historical and religious purposes. Roman alphabet is the de facto secondary writing system in South Korea especially for loan words and is widely used in day-to-day and official communication. There are more than 78 million speakers of the Korean language worldwide. The difference in speech between North and South Korea stem from already pre-existing dialects instead of a supposed post-war divergence.

Demographics

Large-scale emigration from Korea began as early as the mid-1860s, mainly into the Russian Far East and Northeast China (also historically known by the exonym Manchuria); these populations would later grow to more than two million Koreans in China and several hundred thousand Koryo-saram (ethnic Koreans in Central Asia and the former USSR). During the Korea under Japanese rule of 1910–1945, Koreans were often recruited and or forced into labour service to work in mainland Japan, Karafuto Prefecture (Sakhalin), and Manchukuo; the ones who chose to remain in Japan at the end of the war became known as Zainichi Koreans, while the roughly 40,000 Koreans who were trapped in Karafuto after the Soviet invasion are typically referred to as Sakhalin Koreans.

South Korea 
In June 2012, South Korea's population reached 50 million and by the end of 2016, South Korea's population has surpassed 51 million people. Since the 2000s, South Korea has been struggling with a low birthrate, leading some researchers to suggest that if current population trends hold, the country's population will shrink to approximately 38 million population towards the end of the 21st century. In 2018, fertility in South Korea became again a topic of international debate after only 26,500 babies were born in October and an estimated of 325,000 babies in the year, causing the country to have the lowest birth rate in the world.

North Korea

Estimating the size, growth rate, sex ratio, and age structure of North Korea's population has been extremely difficult. Until release of official data in 1989, the 1963 edition of the North Korea Central Yearbook was the last official publication to disclose population figures. After 1963 demographers used varying methods to estimate the population. They either totalled the number of delegates elected to the Supreme People's Assembly (each delegate representing 50,000 people before 1962 and 30,000 people afterwards) or relied on official statements that a certain number of persons, or percentage of the population, was engaged in a particular activity. Thus, on the basis of remarks made by President Kim Il-sung in 1977 concerning school attendance, the population that year was calculated at 17.2 million persons. During the 1980s, health statistics, including life expectancy and causes of mortality, were gradually made available to the outside world.

In 1989, the Central Bureau of Statistics released demographic data to the United Nations Population Fund in order to secure the UNFPA's assistance in holding North Korea's first nationwide census since the establishment of the state in 1948. Although the figures given to the United Nations might have been distorted, it appears that in line with other attempts to open itself to the outside world, the North Korean regime has also opened somewhat in the demographic realm. Although the country lacks trained demographers, accurate data on household registration, migration, and births and deaths are available to North Korean authorities. According to the United States scholar Nicholas Eberstadt and demographer Brian Ko, vital statistics and personal information on residents are kept by agencies on the ri ("village", the local administrative unit) level in rural areas and the dong ("district" or "block") level in urban areas.

Korean diaspora 
Korean emigration to the U.S. was known to have begun as early as 1903, but the Korean American community did not grow to a significant size until after the passage of the Immigration and Nationality Act of 1965; as of 2017, excluding the undocumented and uncounted, roughly 1.85 million Koreans emigrants and people of Korean descent live in the United States according to the official figure by the US Census. The Greater Los Angeles Area and New York metropolitan area in the United States contain the largest populations of ethnic Koreans outside of Korea or China. The Korean population in the United States represents a small share of the American economy, but has a disproportionately positive impact. Korean Americans have a savings rate double that of the U.S. average and also graduate from college at a rate double that of the U.S. average, providing highly skilled and educated professionals to the American workforce. According to the U.S. Census Bureau's Census 2000 data, mean household earnings for ethnic Koreans in the U.S. was $59,981, approximately 5.1% higher than the U.S. average at the time of $56,604.

Significant Korean populations are present in China, Japan, Argentina, Brazil, and Canada as well. The number of Koreans in Indonesia grew during the 1980s, while during the 1990s and 2000s the number of Koreans in the Philippines and Koreans in Vietnam have also grown significantly. In Central Asia, significant populations reside in Uzbekistan and Kazakhstan, as well as parts of Russia including the Far East. Known as Koryo-saram, many of these are ancestors of Koreans who were forcely deported during the Soviet Union's Stalin regime. The Korean overseas community of Uzbekistan is the 5th largest outside Korea.

Koreans in the United Kingdom now form Western Europe's largest Korean community, albeit still relatively small; Koreans in Germany used to outnumber those in the UK until the late 1990s. In Australia, Korean Australians comprise a modest minority. Koreans have migrated significantly since the 1960s.

Part-Korean populations
Pak Noja said that there were 5,747 Japanese-Korean couples in Korea at the end of 1941. Pak Cheil estimated there to be 70,000 to 80,000 "semi-Koreans" in Japan in the years immediately after the war. Many of them remained in Japan as Zainichi Koreans, maintaining their Korean heritage. However, due to assimilation, their numbers are much lower in recent times.

Kopinos are people of mixed Filipino and Korean descent. The proliferation of Kopinos in the Philippines has been a source of controversy as many Kopinos are born to South Korean fathers who impregnate Filipino women and then abandon them. The 'Mixed Filipino Heritage Act of 2020' estimated there were around 30,000 Kopinos.

Lai Đại Hàn is a Vietnamese term referring to mixed children born to South Korean men and South Vietnamese women during the Vietnam War. These children were largely conceived as the result of wartime rape. No exact data is available on the number of Korean-Vietnamese because many of them choose to conceal their roots, but an estimate by a Korean scholar says the number of Lai Dai Han around the world is at least 5,000.

Gallery

See also

Demographics of South Korea
Ethnic groups in Asia
History of Korea
Koreatown
List of people of Korean descent

Notelist

References

Sources

Further reading

External links
 
 
 Korean American Museum
 Korean Residents Union in Japan (Mindan)

 
Ethnic groups in Korea
Ethnic groups in North Korea
Ethnic groups in South Korea